Nguyễn Tiến Minh (born February 12, 1983) is a Vietnamese badminton player. His best achievement to date was the bronze medal at the World Championship in 2013.

Career 
Introduced to badminton by his father at the early age of 10, Nguyen Tien Minh was immediately captivated by the sport. The interest soon developed into a passion which led to Tien Minh's crucial decision in 2001 when the athlete was 18 years old: to take on the path of becoming a professional badminton player instead of carrying on his education as his family wished. The young man's determination soon demonstrated its fruitful aspects when he was recruited into the national team in the same year. However, Tien Minh's career did not become well known nationwide until 2002 when he, at the age of 19, defeated the long time national champion, Nguyễn Phú Cường, and won the gold medal for the men's singles category.

Nevertheless, despite Tien Minh's quick progress, the badminton player was receiving a salary of less than 150 US dollars a month, as most Vietnamese athletes were at the time. After years of contributing to the nation's sport team, while his ranking has been progressing significantly and rapidly, Tien Minh's income has only been increased by around 50 dollars. Vietnamese athletes, with incomes much higher than that of Tien Minh's, normally have specially assigned specialists to look after their every aspect, such as diet, injuries, and endurance training, not to mention all the top ranking sporting facilities provided for by the government. On the other side of the scale, he has been trained in an environment with nothing but poor equipment and has to rely mostly on his family's financial support, the effort of his few coaches, and the contributions of his teammates.

Tien Minh is portrayed by a common description in his home country, "the athlete with a herculean progress".

World Championship 2013 
Nguyen Tien Minh came into the world championship seeded #7. His previous best achievement at a world championship was to get to the quarter-final round at the 2011 championship in London, where he lost to Peter Gade of Denmark in three sets.

The first match was an easy affair (21–8, 21–11) against the New Zealand player Joe Wu, who ranked 110.

The second match against the German Dieter Domke turned out to be quite tight. He started well, but then faded, and almost lost the first set. He was able to close out the set 24–22 though. He then won the second set 21–17.

In the next round, Tien Minh played the Spaniard Pablo Abián. Tien Minh lost the first set 15–21, but came back strongly and easily won the next two sets 21–9, 21–10.

The quarterfinal match between Nguyen Tien Minh and Jan Ø. Jørgensen, rank #9, was a three-setter. Both players knew a lot was at stake here: the winner not only got to the semi-final, but would also be guaranteed a medal (the two losers in the semi-final both win bronze medals). That would be the first medal for both players at a world championship. Tien Minh won in three set match (21–8, 17–21, 22–20). He became the first Vietnamese to win a medal at the world championship.

In the semi-final against Lin Dan, Tien Minh lost 17–21 15–21. Despite the semi-final loss, the bronze medal was still a huge success for him.

Immediately after the championship, Tien Minh was nominated by the governmental sports authority of Vietnam (the TCTDTT - Bureau of Sports and Physical Activities) for an Order of Labor, 2nd class. He had been awarded the Order of Labor, 3rd class in 2011, also for his achievements and excellency in the field of sports.

Personal life 
Nguyen Tien Minh opened a sports apparel and equipment store named Tien Minh Shop in Ho Chi Minh City in early 2016.

In December 2016, Tien Minh married his long-time girlfriend Vũ Thị Trang. Vũ is also a badminton player and has been competing alongside Tien Minh throughout many international tournaments. 

39 as of 2022, Nguyen Tien Minh's 13th time attending the BWF World Championships is a current world record.

Achievements

BWF World Championships 
Men's singles

Asian Championships 
Men's singles

Southeast Asian Games 
Men's singles

BWF Grand Prix (10 titles, 3 runnerups) 
The BWF Grand Prix had two levels, the Grand Prix and Grand Prix Gold. It was a series of badminton tournaments sanctioned by the Badminton World Federation (BWF) and played between 2007 and 2017.

Men's singles

  BWF Grand Prix Gold tournament
  BWF Grand Prix tournament

BWF International Challenge/Series (13 titles, 4 runnerups) 
Men's singles

  BWF International Challenge tournament
  BWF International Series tournament
  BWF Future Series tournament

Record against top-5 players 
Nguyễn Tiến Minh's record against players who have been ranked world no. 5 or higher is as follows:

References

External links
 
 

1983 births
Living people
Sportspeople from Ho Chi Minh City
Vietnamese male badminton players
Badminton players at the 2008 Summer Olympics
Badminton players at the 2012 Summer Olympics
Badminton players at the 2016 Summer Olympics
Olympic badminton players of Vietnam
Badminton players at the 2006 Asian Games
Badminton players at the 2010 Asian Games
Badminton players at the 2014 Asian Games
Badminton players at the 2018 Asian Games
Asian Games competitors for Vietnam
Competitors at the 2003 Southeast Asian Games
Competitors at the 2005 Southeast Asian Games
Competitors at the 2007 Southeast Asian Games
Competitors at the 2009 Southeast Asian Games
Competitors at the 2011 Southeast Asian Games
Competitors at the 2013 Southeast Asian Games
Competitors at the 2015 Southeast Asian Games
Competitors at the 2017 Southeast Asian Games
Southeast Asian Games bronze medalists for Vietnam
Southeast Asian Games medalists in badminton
Badminton players at the 2020 Summer Olympics